Monette can refer to:

People 
 Bob Monette, a Canadian politician
 David Monette, an American craftsman who designs and builds custom-built brass instruments and mouthpieces for musicians
 Paul Monette, an American author, poet, and activist
 Ray Monette, an American songwriter and musician
 Richard Monette, former artistic director of the Stratford Festival of Canada.
 Sarah Monette, American fantasy author
Pierre-Yves Monette, Belgian Mediator, former councilor to King Baudouin and King Albert II of Belgium and Federal Ombudsman of Belgium

Places 
 Monette, Arkansas